Old Hands is a progressive bluegrass studio album by the Yonder Mountain String Band. It was released June 17, 2003 by Frog Pad Records.

The album contains thirteen tracks written by Benny Galloway, who also performs some of them with the band, contributing lead guitar, rhythm guitar, or vocals. He also designed the guitar emblem on the album cover.

Track listing

 "Pride of Alabama" (Benny Galloway)
 "Hill Country Girl" (Bruce Allsopp, Galloway)
 "Big Lights" (Galloway)
 "Deep Pockets" (Galloway, Dave Johnston)
 "Sleepy Cowboy" (Galloway)
 "Train Bound for Glory Land" (Galloway)
 "Wind Through the Willows" (Galloway)
 "Not Far Away" (Galloway)
 "And Going Away" (Galloway)
 "Alone and Blue" (Galloway, Ken Spoor)
 "Everytime" (Galloway)
 "Winds O' Wyoming" (Galloway)
 "Behold, the Rock of Ages" (Galloway)

Chart performance

Album

Personnel

Yonder Mountain String Band

 Dave Johnston – banjo, vocals
 Jeff Austin – mandolin, vocals
 Ben Kaufmann – bass, vocals
 Adam Aijala – guitar, vocals

Other musicians

 Jerry Douglas – dobro
 Darol Anger – fiddle
 Sally Van Meter – vocals, slide guitar, resonator guitar
 Tim O'Brien – fiddle, harmony vocals
 Dirk Powell – accordion
 Casey Driessen – fiddle
 Benny Galloway – guitar, rhythm guitar, vocals

Technical

 David Glasser – mastering
 Sally Van Meter – arranger, producer
 James Tuttle – engineer
 Yonder Mountain String Band – arranger
 Benny Galloway – logo design
 Bryce Wisdom – artwork

References

External links
 Yonder Mountain String Band Official Homepage

2003 albums
Yonder Mountain String Band albums
Frog Pad Records albums